Ronald S. Grinstead (born 25 December 1942) is a retired British international wrestler. He competed at the 1968 Summer Olympics and the 1972 Summer Olympics.

He also represented England in the -82.5 kg division, at the 1966 British Empire and Commonwealth Games in Kingston, Jamaica.

Four years later he won a bronze medal in the same event, at the 1970 British Commonwealth Games in Edinburgh, Scotland. He then competed in a third consecutive Games when he appeared at the 1974 British Commonwealth Games, in Christchurch, New Zealand.

References

External links
 

1942 births
Living people
British male sport wrestlers
Olympic wrestlers of Great Britain
Wrestlers at the 1968 Summer Olympics
Wrestlers at the 1972 Summer Olympics
Sportspeople from London
Commonwealth Games medallists in wrestling
Commonwealth Games bronze medallists for England
Wrestlers at the 1966 British Empire and Commonwealth Games
Wrestlers at the 1970 British Commonwealth Games
Wrestlers at the 1974 British Commonwealth Games
Medallists at the 1970 British Commonwealth Games